USA Today Sports Weekly is an American sports newsmagazine owned by the Gannett Company. A spin-off publication to Gannett's flagship newspaper USA Today, it focuses on coverage of baseball news from Major League Baseball (MLB), Minor League Baseball and the National Collegiate Athletic Association (NCAA) from spring to early fall, as well as football coverage from the National Football League (NFL) during the fall and winter months. The magazine also features statistics for each covered league and interviews with players and staff members.

Sharing production facilities with its parent publication at Gannett's corporate headquarters in McLean, Virginia, Sports Weekly is printed on newsprint and distributed throughout the United States and Canada. The magazine is regularly published on Wednesdays, though special editions that preview major events (such as the World Series and the Super Bowl) or cover fantasy sports are released several times per year, typically on newsprint of better quality than that used in the weekly editions.

Background
The magazine was first published by the Gannett Company as USA Today Baseball Weekly, formatted as a tabloid-sized publication focusing exclusively on baseball coverage that launched on April 5, 1991,
 in concert with the first week of regular season play for that year's Major League Baseball season. For its first ten years of publication, it was released on a weekly basis during the baseball season and bi-weekly during the off-season.

The publication was renamed USA Today Sports Weekly on September 4, 2002, preceding the official start of the 2002 National Football League season, when it began to incorporate stories and statistics about the NFL. The editorial operations of Sports Weekly originally operated autonomously from those managed by the sports department of USA Today, before being integrated with its parent newspaper's sports unit in late 2005.

Sports Weekly added coverage and interviews from the NASCAR circuit beginning with the February 15, 2006 issue. However this lasted only for the auto racing organization's 2006 racing season, with Gannett announcing it was dropping weekly coverage of NASCAR from Sports Weekly after one season after the November 22, 2006 issue of the publication; although it would continue to issue three special editions dedicated to NASCAR on an annual basis. For the 2007 professional and collegiate baseball season, USA Today Sports Weekly announced that it would incorporate more comprehensive baseball coverage, along with the return of college baseball features; beginning with the August 8 issue that year, the magazine also added weekly coverage of the NCAA college football season.

In popular culture
 The first episode of Eastbound & Down included a fictional cover of Sports Weekly featuring the main character.
 In a 2006 episode of Family Guy, the main character Peter Griffin is seen reading Sports Weekly on a plane traveling to London.
 In the 2001 baseball comedy film Summer Catch, one scene features an announcer's booth at a Cape Cod League stadium accidentally being lit on fire when a cigarette ash falls on a pile of fictional Baseball Weekly issues.
 In the 2001 comedy film Shallow Hal, the character Mauricio (Jason Alexander) is shown reading a copy of Baseball Weekly.
 A photo of Bob Dylan appeared in an issue of Rolling Stone in which he was reading Baseball Weekly in a 7-Eleven store.

References

Sports magazines published in the United States
Weekly magazines published in the United States
Magazines established in 1991
NASCAR magazines
Gannett publications
USA Today
1991 establishments in the United States
Magazines published in Virginia